Ultra College of Engineering and Technology was established in the year 2009. It is a technical institution offering undergraduate and postgraduate programs in various disciplines of engineering and technology. The college is located 6 km from Mattuthavani Bus Terminus on Chennai-Madurai highway. It was the first women's engineering college in Madurai. The college has been converted to co-educational institution during 2019–20 academic year. The college is supported by Ultra Trust Madurai.

Departments
The academic departments of the college are:

Civil Engineering
Computer Science and Engineering
Electronics and Communication Engineering
Electrical and Electronics Engineering
Mechanical Engineering
Information Technology

Undergraduate courses (4 years) 
Bachelor of Engineering degree in 
Computer Science and Engineering,
Electronics and Communication Engineering,
Electrical and Electronics Engineering,
Mechanical Engineering

Bachelor of Technology degree in
Information Technology

Postgraduate courses (2 years) 
Master of Engineering degree in
Computer Science and Engineering,
VLSI Design

References

External links 
 

All India Council for Technical Education
Engineering colleges in Tamil Nadu
Colleges in Madurai
Engineering colleges in Madurai
Science and technology in Madurai